Richard A. Kidd (born June 24, 1943) is a retired United States Army soldier who served as the ninth Sergeant Major of the Army. He was sworn in on July 2, 1991 and served until his term expired in June 1995.

Military career
Kidd's assignments include two combat tours in Vietnam (1966–67 and 1970–71) and multiple tours in South Korea, including first sergeant of B Company 1/32nd Infantry Regiment, Camp Howze, South Korea and Europe. Before becoming the Sergeant Major of the Army, he was command sergeant major (CSM) of I Corps and Fort Lewis, Washington. Among his other assignments, he has been command sergeant major for numerous organizations. These included CSM of the 9th Aviation Battalion; 2d Battalion 2d Infantry; Commandant, 1st Armored Division, NCO Academy, Katterbach, Germany. He returned to Fort Lewis after his tour in Germany and served consecutively as CSM of the 4th Battalion, 23rd Infantry Regiment; 3d Brigade, 9th Infantry Division (Motorized); and 9th Infantry Division (Motorized).

Awards and decorations

 11 Service stripes.

Since military retirement, Kidd continues to serve the military community and has received numerous awards including the Outstanding Civilian Service Award, the 2005 Sergeant Major of the Army William G. Bainbridge Medal and in 2006 he received the Doughboy Award for his outstanding contributions to the United States Army Infantry.

Retirement
In 2007, Kidd was Vice President, GEICO Field Representative Sales Management/Military Department. In 2010 Kidd retired from GEICO and lives in Colorado

References
 
 The Sergeants Major of the Army,  Daniel K. Elder, Center of Military History, United States Army Washington, D.C. 2003.

1943 births
Living people
People from Morehead, Kentucky
United States Army personnel of the Vietnam War
Recipients of the Distinguished Service Medal (US Army)
Recipients of the Legion of Merit
Recipients of the Gallantry Cross (Vietnam)
Recipients of the Air Medal
Recipients of the Defense Superior Service Medal
Sergeants Major of the Army